This is a list of lists of historic places in the province of New Brunswick by county or city, from the Canadian Register of Historic Places, which includes federal, provincial, and municipal designations.
Moncton
St. Andrews
Albert County
Carleton County
Charlotte County outside St. Andrews
Gloucester County
Kent County
Kings County
Madawaska County
Northumberland County
Queens County
Restigouche County
Saint John County
Sunbury County
Victoria County
Westmorland County outside Moncton
York County

See also

 List of National Historic Sites in New Brunswick
 Lists of historic places in Canada